Rugby in Scotland may refer to:

Rugby union in Scotland
Rugby league in Scotland